Portal of I is the full-length debut of the Australian progressive metal band Ne Obliviscaris. It was released on May 7, 2012, via Code666 Records.

Track listing
All music by Ne Obliviscaris. All lyrics by Xenoyr.

Personnel
Ne Obliviscaris
 Tim Charles – clean vocals, violin, production
 Xenoyr – harsh vocals, lyrics, cover art
 Matt Klavins – guitar
 Benjamin Baret – guitar
 Brendan "Cygnus" Brown – bass
 Daniel Presland – drums

Additional personnel
 Troy McCosker – audio engineering, production
 Jens Bogren – mixing
 Ken Sorceron – vinyl remastering

References

2012 debut albums
Ne Obliviscaris (band) albums